Mangifera acutigemma is a species of plant in the family Anacardiaceae. It is endemic to Sikkim in India.

References

acutigemma
Flora of East Himalaya
Data deficient plants
Taxonomy articles created by Polbot
Taxa named by André Joseph Guillaume Henri Kostermans